Fawzia Assaad (born 1929) is an Egyptian novelist writing in French.

Life
Fawzia Assaad was born in Cairo. Educated at French schools, she gained a doctorate in philosophy in Paris. Her autombiographical novel L'Égyptienne (1975) portrays the effects of the 1952 Egyptian revolution and the Arab–Israeli conflict on an Egyptian Coptic woman.

Works
 L'Égyptienne: roman. Paris: Mercure de France, 1975. Translated into English as Layla, an Egyptian woman, Trenton, NJ: The Red Sea Press, 2004.
 Préfigurations égyptiennes de la pensée de Nietzsche : essai philosophique. Laussane: L'Age d'homme, 1986.
 Des enfants et des chats. Lausanne: P.-M. Favre,  1987.
 La grande maison de Louxor: roman. Paris: L'Harmattan, 1992.
 Hatshepsout, femme pharaon: biographie mythique. Paris: Librairie Orientaliste Paul Geuthner. With a preface by Michel Butor.
 Hatshepsout, Akhenaton, Néfertiti: pharaons hérétiques. Paris : Geuthner, impr. 2007
 Préfigurations égyptiennes des dogmes chrétiens. Paris: Geuthner, 2013.

References

1929 births
Living people
Egyptian novelists
Egyptian women writers
Writers from Cairo
Egyptian writers in French